5th Canadian Division Support Base (5 CDSB) Gagetown, formerly known as and commonly referred to as CFB Gagetown, is a large Canadian Forces Base covering an area over , located in southwestern New Brunswick.

Construction of the base 

At the beginning of the Cold War, Canadian defence planners recognized the need for providing the Canadian Army with a suitable training facility where brigade and division-sized armoured, infantry, and artillery units could exercise in preparation for their role in defending western Europe under Canada's obligations to the North Atlantic Treaty. The facility would need to be located relatively close to an all-season Atlantic port and have suitable railway connections.
Existing training facilities dating from the First and Second World Wars in eastern Canada were relatively small (Camp Debert, Camp Aldershot, Sussex Military Camp, Camp Valcartier, Camp Petawawa, Camp Utopia), thus a new facility was considered. At the same time, regional economic development planners saw an opportunity for a military base to benefit the economy of southwestern New Brunswick.

Over 900 families inhabited the area primarily engaged in agriculture and forestry industries. The terrain was variable, providing mixed Acadian forest, swamp and marshland, as well as open farming areas similar to the North European Plain. The influence of the St. Croix Highlands, part of the Appalachian Mountain range, creates hilly terrain and valleys in the southern and western part of the region close to the Nerepis and Oromocto Rivers.

The expropriation of lands began in the early 1950s, much to the surprise of local residents who had been kept in the dark about the expropriation until the last minute. The base was surveyed so as to not affect some of the historic communities along the western bank of the Saint John River such as Gagetown, Hampstead, and Browns Flat; the expropriation began several kilometres west of the river and eliminated the communities of Petersville, Hibernia, New Jerusalem, North Clones and others. This remains the largest single land expropriation in the history of New Brunswick.

The base headquarters were chosen for the northern part of the base adjacent to the (then) small village of Oromocto. In preparation for the influx of service personnel, Oromocto was redesigned as a "planned" town, with buried electrical utilities and residential and commercial clustering typical of larger planned towns such as Richmond Hill, Ontario.

Construction of the base facilities in Oromocto benefited from convenient railway connections provided by Canadian National and Canadian Pacific Railways. A new alignment of the Trans-Canada Highway was built on the eastern bank of the Saint John River, opposite from Oromocto in the early 1960s (see Route 2) and a new highway bridge across the Saint John River connected the Trans-Canada Highway to the village of Burton, just south of Oromocto and near the east gate for the base.

The Gagetown Military Camp (or Camp Gagetown) opened in 1956 and was named after the village of Gagetown, although the base was located west of this historic village and was headquartered  to its north in Oromocto. The base's territory measured  and included numerous live-fire ranges for infantry, armoured, and artillery units, as well as aerial weapons ranges.

At the time of its opening in 1956, until the opening of Shoalwater Bay Military Training Area in Australia in 1965, Camp Gagetown was the largest military training facility in the Commonwealth of Nations. By comparison, CFB Suffield has  with  usable by the military, and  designated as the Suffield National Wildlife Area.

The training area has been heavily "landscaped" over the years by military foresters and many woodlines have been sculpted to form shapes recognizable from the air, including:
 Scotty Dog Woods 
 Square Woods
 Flag Woods
 The "CTC" cutting 
 The "Maple Leaf" cutting

Operations 

Initially, Camp Gagetown was the home base for many army regiments, including The Black Watch and The Royal Canadian Regiment; however, defence cutbacks in the 1960s saw a gradual reduction, and the demise of their parent formation, 3 Brigade Group. On February 1, 1968, the Canadian Army, the Royal Canadian Air Force, and the Royal Canadian Navy were merged to form the unified Canadian Forces. Following this unification, Camp Gagetown was renamed Canadian Forces Base Gagetown (CFB Gagetown).

In the post-unification armed forces, CFB Gagetown functioned as the primary combat training centre for Force Mobile Command (renamed Land Force Command in the 1990s). In the early 1970s Combat Training Centre Gagetown (CTC Gagetown) was established as a unit at CFB Gagetown comprising armour, artillery, and infantry training schools. In the early 1970s 422 and 403 helicopter squadrons were relocated to CFB Gagetown. Their helipad is located at the end of Champlain Road. In the 1990s the Canadian Forces School of Military Engineering was relocated to CFB Gagetown from CFB Chilliwack. The base is still widely referred to as Camp Gagetown.

Increased defence spending in the 1980s saw numerous new training facilities built and ranges modernized, and this continued into the 1990s as the Canadian Forces closed smaller bases in response to further defence budget cuts. A large training building housing much of CTC was opened in late 1992. CFB Gagetown continues to function as the army's primary training facility, although due to risk of forest fires in recent years, live-fire training has been pushed primarily to the fall-winter-spring seasons.

Units and formations 

Principal units and formations of the CFB Gagetown are:

 5th Canadian Division 
 Combat Training Centre (Royal Canadian Armoured Corps School, Royal Canadian Artillery School, Canadian Forces School of Military Engineering, Infantry School and Tactics School)
 5th Canadian Division Support Group
 42 Health Services
 1 Dental Unit Detachment Gagetown and the Joint Personnel Support Unit
 2nd Battalion, The Royal Canadian Regiment
 4th Artillery Regiment (General Support), RCA
 4 Engineer Support Regiment
 403 Helicopter Operational Training Squadron
 C Squadron, The Royal Canadian Dragoons
 Joint Meteorological Centre 
 Canadian Army Trials and Evaluation Unit
 5th Canadian Division Training Centre
 3 Military Police Regiment Detachment Gagetown 
 Argonaut Army Cadet Summer Training Centre

Defoliant testing 

Portions of the training area were subject to testing of defoliants during the 1960s. The use of Agent Orange and Agent Purple has led to an inquiry as to its long-term effects upon the soldiers and civilian base personnel who were exposed to it. The affected areas had soil tests that measured dioxin levels at 143 times the Canadian Council of Ministers of the Environment guidelines for maximum exposure.

St. Mary's Chapel 
CFB Gagetown has a chapel that is administered by the Military Ordinariate of Canada. Services at the chapel are available for all military persons and the civilian personnel of the base. During the week, the chapel organizes Mass in French and English.

Economic facts 
The base and its lodger units provide full-time employment to approximately 6,500 military members and 1,000 civilians.

References

Further reading 

 Parr, Joy (2010). Sensing Changes: Technologies, Environments, and the Everyday, 1953-2003, UBC Press.

External links 

 5th Canadian Division Support Base Gagetown
 Places of Our Hearts, a Community Memories, Virtual Museum of Canada Exhibition
Military museum of the CFB Gagetown

Buildings and structures in Queens County, New Brunswick
Buildings and structures in Sunbury County, New Brunswick
Canadian Forces bases in New Brunswick
Heliports in Canada
Military airbases in New Brunswick
Royal Canadian Regiment
Defoliants